Eresk (also known as Arishk) is a city in, and the capital of, Eresk District of Boshruyeh County, South Khorasan province, Iran. At the 2006 census, its population was 2,657 in 783 households, when it was a village in the former Boshruyeh District of Ferdows County.

The following census in 2011 counted 2,954 people in 909 households, by which time the district had been separated from the county, Boshruyeh County established, and Eresk elevated from village to city status as capital of the newly formed Eresk District. The latest census in 2016 showed a population of 2,955 people in 980 households.

References 

Boshruyeh County

Cities in South Khorasan Province

Populated places in South Khorasan Province

Populated places in Boshruyeh County